Eastern Sephardim are a distinctive sub-group of Sephardi Jews, mostly descended from families expelled and exiled from Iberia as Jews in the 15th century following the Alhambra Decree of 1492 in Spain and the decree of 1497 in Portugal. This branch of descendants of the Jews of Iberia settled in the Eastern Mediterranean.

Eastern Sephardim settled mostly in various parts of the Ottoman Empire, which included areas in West Asia (Middle East, Anatolia, etc.), the Balkans in Southern Europe, plus Egypt. For centuries, these Jews made up the majority of the population of Salonica (now Thessaloniki, Greece) and were present in large numbers in Constantinople (now Istanbul, Turkey) and Sarajevo (in what is now Bosnia and Herzegovina), all of which were located in the Ottoman-ruled parts of Europe.

Some migrated farther east to territories of the Ottoman Empire, settling among the long-established Arabic-speaking Jewish communities in Baghdad in Iraq, Damascus in Syria and Alexandria in Egypt. A few of the Eastern Sephardim followed the spice trade routes as far as the Malabar coast of southern India, where they settled among the established Cochin Jewish community, again imparting their culture and customs to the local Jews. The presence of Sephardim and New Christians along the Malabar coast eventually aroused the ire of the Catholic Church, which then obtained permission from the Portuguese crown to establish the Goan Inquisition against the Sephardic Jews of India.

In recent times, principally after 1948, most Eastern Sephardim have since relocated to Israel, and others to the United States, France and Latin America.

History
In the 19th century Sephardic communities in Istanbul, Salonica, Izmir and other parts of the Ottoman Empire started to become more secular. Westernization was favored by various forces both within the Empire and in Europe, including the Alliance Israélite Universelle. However, not all aspects of Western culture were embraced. Despite efforts by the secular Jewish press and Alliance to promote French, the majority of Turkish Jews were still speaking Ladino in the early 20th century. Though the power structures within the community were influenced by Western influences, religious tradition remained an important part of community life, despite the lessening of rabbinic authority, and the Reform Judaism movement that developed in Germany (and later the United States) never took hold in Ottoman lands.

Ladino literature
Before the 18th century most mainstream Ottoman Jewish literature was published in Hebrew. The few books that were written in Ladino catered to Marranos who had escaped the Inquisitions in Spain and Portugal and were returning to Judaism. It wasn't until the 1730s that rabbinic literature started being published in Ladino. Through the 19th century Ladino literature flourished in the Ottoman Empire. Though Musar literature, also called "ethical literature" or didactic literature, is one of the least studied genres of Jewish literature, it is also one of the most ancient and influential. Musar literature written in the Ladino tongue paralleled the emergence of Hasidic literature in the 18th century among the Ashkenazim, which was also primarily a didactic body of literature. 

Examples of Sephardic literature from the Ottoman Empire include the Shevet Musar by Elijah ha-Kohen (b.1645, d.1729 in Izmir, Turkey), whose work may have been influenced by earlier Sabbatean teachings. Another writer, Isaac Bekhor Amarachi, ran a printing business and also translated some works from Hebrew into Ladino, including a biography of the English-Sephardic philanthropist Moses Montefiore. Though the writings of Abraham Palachi, chief rabbi of Izmir, are markedly conservative, Palachi was a strong supported of improving French language education in his community and spoke at the opening of a new Alliance Israélite school in 1873. Sephardi writer Judah Papo, who died in Jerusalem in 1873, was one of the teachers of Judah Alkalai.

Relationship to other Sephardi communities
The term Sephardi is derived from Sepharad. The location of the biblical Sepharad is disputed, but Sepharad was identified by later Jews as Hispania, that is, the Iberian Peninsula. Sepharad now means "Spain" in modern Hebrew.

Their traditional spoken languages were referred to as Judaeo-Spanish and Judaeo-Portuguese. In most locales, where the Eastern Sephardim settled, the indigenous Jewish population came to adopt the culture and customs of the recent Sephardic arrivals. This phenomenon is just one of the factors which has today led to the broader religious definition of Sephardi.

The relationship among Sephardic communities is illustrated in the following diagram:

Language
Historically, the vernacular language of Eastern Sephardim was Judeo-Spanish, a Romance language also called Ladino (specifically "Ladino Oriental" or Eastern Ladino) and Judezmo ("Jewish [language]"). The language is derived from Old Spanish, plus Hebrew and Aramaic. The language was taken by Eastern Sephardim in the 15th century after the expulsion from Spain in 1492, where it was heavily influenced by Maghrebi Arabic.

By contrast, the languages spoken by related Sephardi communities and descendants include:

 Haketia, also called "Ladino Occidental" (Western Ladino), a Judaeo-Spanish variety also derived from Old Spanish, plus Hebrew and Aramaic. Spoken by North African Sephardim. Taken with North African Sephardim in the 15th century after the expulsion from Spain in 1492, this dialect was heavily influenced by Maghrebi Arabic.
 Early Modern Spanish and Early Modern Portuguese, including in a mixture of the two. Traditionally spoken or used liturgically by the ex-converso Western Sephardim. Taken with them during their later migration out of Iberia in the 16th to 18th centuries as conversos, after which they reverted to Judaism.
 Modern Spanish and Modern Portuguese varieties, traditionally spoken by the Sephardic Bnei Anusim of Iberia and Ibero-America, including some recent returnees to Judaism (Neo-Western Sephardim) in the late 20th and early 21st centuries. In most cases these varieties have incorporated loanwords from the indigenous languages of the Americas introduced following the Spanish conquest.

Surnames
Eastern Sephardim still often carry common Spanish surnames, as well as other specifically Sephardic surnames from 15th century Spain with Arabic or Hebrew language origins (such as Azoulay, Abulafia, Abravanel) which have since disappeared from Spain when those that stayed behind as conversos adopted surnames that were solely Spanish in origin. Other Eastern Sephardim have since also translated their Hispanic surnames into the languages of the regions they settled in, or have modified them to sound more local.

Return migration to Portugal
In recent years, several hundred Turkish Jews, who have been able to prove that they are descended from Portuguese Jews who had been expelled from Portugal in 1497, have emigrated to Portugal and acquired Portuguese citizenship.

See also
 Mashriqi Jews
 Mizrahi Jews
 North African Sephardim
 Sephardic Anusim
 Western Sephardim
 Sephardic Bnei Anusim
 Neo-Western Sephardim
 Sephardic Jews in India

References

Jewish ethnic groups
Sephardi Jews topics